Lists of floods in the United States provide overviews of major floods in the United States. They are organized by time period: before 1901, from 1901 to 2000, and from 2001 to the present.

Lists

 Floods in the United States before 1901
 Floods in the United States: 1901–2000
 Floods in the United States: 2001–present